Beverly Jenkins (born 1951, Detroit) is an American author of historical and contemporary romance novels with a particular focus on 19th century African-American life. Jenkins was a 2013 NAACP Image Award nominee and, in 1999, was voted one of the Top 50 Favorite African-American writers of the 20th century by the African American Literature Book Club. Jenkins's historical romances are set during a period of African-American history that she believes is often overlooked. This made it difficult to break into publishing because publishers weren't sure what to do with stories that involved African-Americans but not slavery.

Jenkins studied at Michigan State University as a Journalism and English Literature major. She lives in Southeastern Michigan.

Early life
Jenkins was born in Detroit in 1951 to her parents, a high school teacher and an administrative aide. Jenkins grew up surrounded by words. Her mother read to Jenkins while she was in the womb and bought her cloth books when she was a baby. Jenkins would chew on the cloth books while her mother encouraged her to "Eat those words, baby. Eat those words." Jenkins read widely at her local library, everything from Alice in Wonderland to Dune to Zane Gray to early romance writers like Victoria Holt, Mary Stewart & Phyllis Whitney. Her early writing began when she became the editor of her elementary school newspaper. Jenkins attended Michigan State University in the spring of 1969.

Career
Jenkins worked full-time in the Michigan State University library's circulation department. Each lunch hour, she would read articles from The Journal of Negro History (now called The Journal of African American History). Eventually, Jenkins and her husband moved to Ypsilanti, where she worked at the Parke Davis Pharmaceuticals' reference desk and began writing romance novels for fun. At the suggestion of a colleague, Jenkins looked for an agent and publisher. Avon published her first novel, Night Song, in 1994.

Though Jenkins has published books in many romance sub-genres, the majority of her books are historical romances. Jenkins calls herself a "kitchen table historian." She likens American history to a quilt with some pieces ripped out—the pieces belonging to minority history. Jenkins uses her books to weave the quilt back together by revealing patches of black history that are rarely taught in school. Slavery and the Civil Rights Movement are important pieces of African American history, but they aren't the only pieces. For example, her first three novels, Night Song, Vivid and Indigo, feature characters such as a schoolteacher, a cavalry officer, a female doctor and Underground Railroad heroes. They were all inspired by true history.

Jenkins found inspiration for Forbidden from two interesting bits of history. First, she read a news article about a high-end African American-run hotel that was uncovered during an archaeological dig in Virginia City. She also heard a story about a man seeing a black woman walking through the desert with a cook stove balanced on her head. Jenkins includes bibliographies with her historical romances so readers can read further, if they choose.

Bibliography

Awards
1996 – Romantic Times Historical Love and Laughter Nominee
1999 – Romantic Times Western Historical Romance Winner
2000 – Romantic Times Multicultural Romance Winner
2007 – Romantic Times Historical Storyteller of the Year Nominee
2010 – A Second Helping – Romantic Times Multicultural Fiction Novel Winner
2011 – Something Old, Something New – Romantic Times Multicultural Romance Winner
2013 – Destiny's Embrace – Romantic Times American-Set Historical Romance Winner
2013 – A Wish and a Prayer – NAACP Image Award for Literature Nominee
2016 – Forbidden – Romantic Times Historical Romance Winner
2017 – RWA Nora Roberts Lifetime Achievement Award

References

External links

1951 births
20th-century American women writers
21st-century American women writers
20th-century American novelists
21st-century American novelists
African-American novelists
American romantic fiction novelists
American women novelists
Living people
Michigan State University alumni
20th-century African-American women writers
20th-century African-American writers
21st-century African-American women writers
21st-century African-American writers